Mohamed Ali Bhar (born 17 September 1989) is a Tunisian handball player for Espérance de Tunis and the Tunisian national team.

He participated at the 2016 Summer Olympics.

References

1989 births
Living people
Tunisian male handball players
Handball players at the 2016 Summer Olympics
Olympic handball players of Tunisia
Mediterranean Games competitors for Tunisia
Competitors at the 2022 Mediterranean Games